E15, E-15, E.15 or E 15 may refer to:

Places
 European route E15
 E15, a district in the London, England E postcode area 
 E15, a numeronym for the Eyjafjallajökull volcano in Iceland
 E15, the MIT Media Lab building
 Monzen-Nakachō Station of the Toei Subway (station number T-12/E-15)
 Butterworth–Kulim Expressway, route E15 in Malaysia

Technology
 HMS E15, a  World War I-era United Kingdom Royal Navy submarine
 E15 fuel
 E15, a model rocket motor classification
 E15 (software), a scriptable OpenGL interface to web content
 General Electric E-15, an Elec-Trak electric tractor

Other uses
 E 15: 1015, see Peta-
 E -15: 10−15, see femto-
 Queen's Indian Defense (Encyclopaedia of Chess Openings code)